Gelperin is a surname. Notable people with the surname include:

Alan Gelperin, the scientist and biologist currently at Princeton University.
Dave Gelperin  chaired the working groups developing the IEEE 829-1989 software testing documentation standard.
 (1903–1989), the Soviet chemical engineer who  designed the FAB-5000 bomb.

See also 
 Galperin, a list of people with the surname
 Halperin, a list of people with the surname
 Galperina, a list of people with the surname